The women's field hockey tournament at the 2008 Summer Olympics was the 8th edition of the field hockey event for women at the Summer Olympic Games. It was held over a thirteen-day period beginning on 10 August, and culminating with the medal finals on 22 August. All games were played at the hockey field constructed on the Olympic Green in Beijing, China.

The Netherlands won the gold medal for the second time after defeating China 2–0 in the final. Argentina won the bronze medal by defeating defending champions Germany 3–1.

Competition format
The twelve teams in the tournament were divided into two pools of six, with each team initially playing round-robin games within their pool. Following the completion of the round-robin, the top two teams from each pool advance to the semifinals. All other teams play classification matches to determine the final tournament rankings. The two semi-final winners meet for the gold medal match, while the semi-final losers play in the bronze medal match.

Qualification
Each of the continental champions from five federations and host received an automatic berth. The European federation received two extra quotas, while Oceanian received one extra quota, based upon the FIH World Rankings at the completion of the 2006 World Cup. In addition to the three teams qualifying through the Olympic Qualifying Tournaments, the following twelve teams, shown with final pre-tournament rankings, competed in this tournament.

 – China qualified both as host and continental champion, therefore that quota was given to the Asian federation allowing Japan to qualify directly to the 2008 Summer Olympics as the second-placed team at the 2006 Asian Games .

Umpires
Fifteen umpires for the women's event were appointed by the FIH. During each match, a video umpire was used to assist the on-field umpires in determining if a goal had been legally scored.

Squads

Results
All times are China Standard Time (UTC+08:00)

First round

Pool A

Pool B

Fifth to twelfth place classification

Eleventh and twelfth place

Ninth and tenth place

Seventh and eighth place

Fifth and sixth place

Medal round

Semi-finals

Bronze medal match

Gold medal match

Statistics

Final ranking

Goalscorers

11 goals
 Maartje Paumen

5 goals
 Alejandra Gulla
 Fu Baorong
 Lee Seon-ok

4 goals
 Carla Rebecchi
 Casey Eastham
 Tang Chunling
 Angie Loy

3 goals
 Nikki Hudson
 Angela Lambert
 Sarah Young
 Li Hongxia
 Crista Cullen
 Anke Kühn
 Fanny Rinne
 Keli Smith

2 goals
 Claudia Burkart
 Soledad García
 Mariné Russo
 Shelly Liddelow
 Gao Lihua
 Janine Beermann
 Eileen Hoffmann
 Natascha Keller
 Marion Rodewald
 Keiko Miura
 Gim Sung-hee
 Park Jeong-sook
 Park Mi-hyun
 Marilyn Agliotti
 Ellen Hoog
 Gemma Flynn
 Vida Ryan

1 goal
 Luciana Aymar
 Noel Barrionuevo
 Rosario Luchetti
 Madonna Blyth
 Emily Halliday
 Hope Munro
 Megan Rivers
 Ma Yibo
 Song Qingling
 Zhao Yudiao
 Melanie Clewlow
 Alex Danson
 Anne Panter
 Sarah Thomas
 Katharina Scholz
 Kaori Chiba
 Rika Komazawa
 Sakae Morimoto
 Toshie Tsukui
 Kim Da-rae
 Kim Eun-sil
 Kim Jong-eun
 Kim Mi-sun
 Minke Booij
 Wieke Dijkstra
 Maartje Goderie
 Eefke Mulder
 Janneke Schopman
 Naomi van As
 Jaimee Claxton
 Krystal Forgesson
 Jo Galletly
 Lizzy Igasan
 Niniwa Roberts
 Cindy Brown
 Kate Hector
 Marsha Marescia
 Jennifer Wilson
 Núria Camón
 Raquel Huertas
 Silvia Muñoz
 María Romagosa
 Pilar Sánchez
 Esther Termens
 Rocío Ybarra
 Kate Barber
 Kayla Bashore
 Dana Sensenig
 Tiffany Snow

References

External links
Official FIH website

 
Women's tournament
2008
Summer Olympics
2008 Summer Olympics
Field hockey